Ostravar Brewery is a Czech brewery located in the city of Ostrava. Ostravar was founded in 1897 as a joint stock company in Moravská Ostrava, and the first beer here was brewed in 1898. In 1997 the brewery was acquired by Bass, after a merger with the company Pražské pivovary a.s, which also brews Staropramen. It is one of the few Czech breweries which produces a dry stout, branded Kelt.

For most of its history the beer was only sold locally around Ostrava and the Moravian-Silesian region. In 2016 the brewery opened its first restaurant, called Ostravarna, and started an initiative to start selling the beer in other parts of the Czech Republic.

Products 
Ostravar Original – a pale draught beer with 4.1% ABV (in Czech: 10° or Výčepní).
Ostravar Mustang – a pale lager with 4.9% ABV (in Czech: 11° or Ležák). 
Ostravar Premium – a pale lager with 5.1% ABV (in Czech: 12° or Ležák). 
Ostravar Gavora – a special edition 11.4° wheat beer with 5.0% ABV (in Czech:Pšeničné).

See also
 Beer in the Czech Republic

References

Ostrava
Breweries in the Czech Republic